Cédric Joqueviel (born July 21, 1982) is a former professional footballer who played as a centre-back. Born in France, he emigrated to Canada.

Career

Early career in France
Joqueviel was a member of the youth academy at French Championnat de France amateur 2 side Castelnau Le Crès, and played for both Montpellier  and the senior Castelnau Le Crès team, before coming to North America in 2006.

Canada
Joqueviel signed with Montreal Impact of the USL First Division in 2007, but was sent on loan to Montreal's farm team, Trois-Rivières Attak in the Canadian Soccer League for the season. He helped Attak win the 2007 Open Canada Cup, and was named the team's most valuable player for the 2007 season.

He graduated up to the senior Impact side in 2008, and played 19 first team games for the team in his debut season. On December 2, 2008 the Impact announced the re-signing of Joqueviel to a three-year contract. Midway through the 2010 season Joqueviel terminated his contract with Impact and returned to France "to family reasons"; he had played 38 games and scored one goal for the Impact, winning the Canada Cup, the Nutrilite Canadian Championship, a USL First Division title, and going deep into the CONCACAF Champions League.

Personal
Joqueviel became a Canadian permanent resident in April 2010.

Honors

Montreal Impact
USL First Division Championship (1): 2009

Career stats

References

External links
Montreal Impact bio 

1982 births
Living people
Footballers from Montpellier
Canadian soccer players
French footballers
French emigrants to Canada
Canadian Soccer League (1998–present) players
Expatriate soccer players in Canada
Association football defenders
French expatriate footballers
French expatriate sportspeople in Canada
Montpellier HSC players
Montreal Impact (1992–2011) players
Trois-Rivières Attak players
USL First Division players
USSF Division 2 Professional League players
Castelnau Le Crès FC players